Jhalak Dikhhla Jaa is an Indian Hindi-language reality television show and the Indian version of BBC's Strictly Come Dancing and Dancing with the Stars. The show pairs celebrities with professional dancers. Each couple performs predetermined dances and competes against the others for judges' points and audience votes. The couple receiving the lowest combined total of judges' points and audience votes is eliminated each week until only the champion dance pair remains.

Concept
In Jhalak Dikhhla Jaa, celebrities perform various dances together with professional dance partners. The first four seasons of Jhalak Dikhhla Jaa were aired on Sony TV. From its fifth season it has been airing on Colors TV. The show's format is taken from the Strictly Come Dancing show on BBC One in the UK. and Dancing With The Stars. The show is also pre-recorded, unlike Strictly Come Dancing and other spin-offs. Of the spin offs, the Jhalak Dikhhla Jaa is the only one that uses recorded tracks rather than live music with an in-house band. The title derives from "Jhalak Dikhlaja" (Let Me Have a Glimpse of You), a  song from the film Aksar (2006), composed and sung by Himesh Reshammiya.

Although the show features mixed-sex couples, but the tenth season saw, for the first time, the participation of same-sex couple Dutee Chand and Raveena Choudhary (considering that Gaurav Gera in ninth season performed as fictional character-Chutki).

Elimination
The show airs its elimination on a Sunday in every season. Contestants who are in the danger zone go into the face-off round.

Series overview

Judges and Hosts

Presenters
 Parmeet Sethi (2006)
 Archana Puran Singh (2006)
 Rohit Roy (2007, 2009)
 Shweta Tiwari (2009)
 Shiv Panditt (2009)
 Mona Singh (2007, 2010–11)
 Sumeet Raghavan (2010–11)
 Ragini Khanna (2012)
 Kapil Sharma (2013)
 Drashti Dhami (2014)
 Ranvir Shorey (2014)
 Manish Paul (2012–2017,2022)
 Arjun Bijlani (2022)

Judges
 Farah Khan (2006, 2016–2017)
 Shilpa Shetty (2006)
 Sanjay Leela Bhansali (2006)
 Urmila Matondkar (2007)
 Jeetendra (2007)
 Shiamak Davar (2007)
 Saroj Khan (2009)
 Juhi Chawla (2009)
 Vaibhavi Merchant (2009)
 Madhuri Dixit (2010–14,2022)
 Remo D'Souza (2010–14)
 Malaika Arora (2010, 2015)
 Maksim Chmerkovskiy (2014)
 Shahid Kapoor (2015)
 Lauren Gottlieb (2015)
 Karan Johar (2012–2017,2022)
 Ganesh Hegde (2015–2016)
 Jacqueline Fernandez (2016–2017)
 Nora Fatehi (2022)
 Terence Lewis (2022)

Contestant pattern

Choreographers 
For each season, the celebrities are paired with a professional partner who instructs them in the various dances each week and competes alongside them in the televised competition. A total of professional partners have appeared alongside celebrities, some for only one season (mostly in the earliest seasons). Shampa Gopikrishna has most wins of any choreographer, with 2.

Note- In the below table, child professional partners are excluded as they have dance mentors.

Key:

 Won the season
 Placed second in the season
 Placed third in the season
 Placed fourth (in the final) of the season
 Placed last in the season
 Withdrew in the season
 Wildcard but Not Selected
 Participating in current season

Season 1

Jhalak Dikhhla Jaa 1 is the first season of the dance reality show, Jhalak Dikhhla Jaa. It premiered on 7 September 2006 until 4 November 2006.
The season was judged by Sanjay Leela Bhansali, Shilpa Shetty and Farah Khan. The season was hosted by Parmeet Sethi and Archana Puran Singh. The winner was Mona Singh. The contestants were:

Season 2

Jhalak Dikhhla Jaa 2 is the second season of the dance reality show, Jhalak Dikhhla Jaa. It premiered on 28 September 2007 until 15 December 2007.

Shiamak Davar, Urmila Matondkar and Jeetendra were the judges. Rohit Roy and Mona Singh were the hosts. Prachi Desai and Deepak were the winners. The contestants were:

Season 3

Judges 
Saroj Khan
Juhi Chawla
Vaibhavi Merchant

Presenters 
Shiv Panditt/Rohit Roy
Shweta Tiwari

Contestants

Season 4

Judges 
 Madhuri Dixit
 Remo D'souza
 Malaika Arora Khan

Presenters 
 Mona Singh
 Sumeet Raghavan

Contestants

Season 5

Judges
Madhuri Dixit,
Karan Johar
Remo D'Souza

Presenters
Manish Paul 
Ragini Khanna

Contestants

Season 6

Judges
Madhuri Dixit
Remo D'souza 
Karan Johar

Presenters
Manish Paul 
Kapil Sharma

Contestants

Season 7

Judges 
Karan Johar
Madhuri Dixit
Remo D'souza
Maksim Chmerkovskiy as guest judge for two weeks

Presenters 
Ranvir Shorey
Drashti Dhami/Manish Paul

Contestants

Season 8

Judges 
Karan Johar/Malaika Arora Khan
Shahid Kapoor
Lauren Gottlieb
Ganesh Hegde

Presenter 
Manish Paul

Contestants

Season 9

The ninth season started on 30 July 2016.

Judges 
Karan Johar
Farah Khan
Jacqueline Fernandez
Ganesh Hegde

Presenter 
Manish Paul

Contestants 
 Teriya Magar and Aryan Patra – Winner
 Salman Yusuff Khan and Aishwarya Radhakrishnan – Runner-up
 Shantanu Maheshwari and Alisha Singh – 2nd Runner-up
 Siddharth Nigam and Vaishnavi Patil – 4th Place
 Dwayne Bravo and Bhavna Purohit – 5th Place
 Swasti Nitya and Preetjot Singh – 6th Place
 Karishma Tanna and Rajit Dev – 7th Place
 Shakti Arora and Suchitra Sawant – 8th Place
 Spandan Chaturvedi – Hardik Rupanail – 9th Place
 Nora Fatehi and Cornel Rodrigues – 10th Place
 Gracy Goswami and Sachin Sharma – 11th Place
 Surveen Chawla and Sanam Johar – 12th Place
 Arjun Bijlani and Bhavna Khanduja – 13th Place
 Helly Shah and Jai Kumar Nair– 14th Place
 Sidhant Gupta and Pranalini Atul – 15th Place
 Harpal Singh Sokhi and Bhavna Purohit – 16th Place
 Poonam Shah and Priyanka Shah – 17th Place
 Gaurav Gera and Diwakar Nayal – 18th Place

Season 10

The tenth season of Jhalak Dikhhla Jaa premiered on September 3, 2022 making its comeback after a hiatus of five years.

Judges 
Madhuri Dixit
Nora Fatehi
Karan Johar
Terence Lewis as guest judge for two weeks

Presenter 
Manish Paul
Arjun Bijlani as guest anchor for a week

Contestants

References

External links

 
 

Dancing with the Stars
2006 Indian television series debuts
Dance competition television shows
Indian dance television shows
Sony Entertainment Television original programming
Colors TV original programming
Indian television series based on British television series